Pacific Sunwear of California, LLC is an American retail clothing brand. The company sells lifestyle apparel, along with swim, footwear and accessories designed for teens and young adults. As of 2022, the company operates 325 stores in all 50 states and Puerto Rico. PacSun is headquartered in Anaheim, California, and operates a distribution center in Groveport, Ohio. The company's regional directors, district managers and store positions are located throughout the United States. The company went bankrupt in April 2016 and is now owned by Golden Gate Capital.

History
Initially founded by Jack Hopkins and Tom Moore in 1980, its roots can be traced back to a small surf shop in Seal Beach, California. PacSun built its business selling merchandise from established surf brands but later expanded to include skate and street wear labels. The company offers products for both men and women that include: jeans, tees, tanks, polos, knits, flannels, hoodies, boardshorts, bikinis, shorts, pants, dresses, rompers, skirts, sweaters, jackets, snow apparel, shoes, sandals and accessories. The company went public on March 15, 1993 and at its height had over 1,300 stores in all 50 states. PacSun opened a second chain of stores called d.e.m.o., in 2000. The last of these stores closed in 2008.On February 23, 2005, the company restated results for certain periods to correct its accounting for leases.

In 2012, PacSun collaborated with celebrity influencers Kendall Jenner and Kylie Jenner to produce their own fashion line.

From 2009 to 2017, Gary Schoenfeld was the CEO of PacSun. Following his departure from the organization, James Gulmi became the interim CEO.

In 2016, PacSun filed for Chapter 11 bankruptcy and reorganized through a debt-for-equity restructuring agreement with Golden Gate Capital, emerging as a privately owned company. At the time of the bankruptcy filing, there were 593 stores with no immediate plans to close any locations.

In 2018, PacSun merged with Eddie Bauer, also owned by Golden Gate, to form PSEB. Mike Egeck, CEO and President of Eddie Bauer, became the Chief Executive Officer of PSEB, with oversight of both the Eddie Bauer and PacSun brands. James Gulmi continued to serve as a PSEB director.

In 2020, Egeck stepped down from his role of CEO, but remained as an active Board member and shareholder. PSEB announced that James Gulmi would become the interim CEO, a role he previously held from 2017 to 2018. At the time of the announcement, PacSun was down to 400 stores.

Marketing practices 
In May 2011, PacSun launched its first national advertising campaign called 'Dress Irresponsibly'. The highlight of the campaign included television commercials aired across a variety of networks that featured famous athletes from the brands they work with. Appearances by Rob Machado, Bucky Lasek, Chris Pfanner, Kelia Moniz, Ryan Dungey and Leo Romero, were significant in helping re-establish the brand among its male audience. Other elements of the campaign included print media in both endemic and fashion publications, and a digital engagement initiative on Facebook titled 'Dress Irresponsibly: Style Challenge.' Through a customized Facebook app fans were encouraged to upload photos of themselves that met weekly style challenges in exchange for a chance to win a styling gig at Nylon in New York City.

Following the launch of the Dress Irresponsibly campaign, PacSun continued to evolve from just a surf and skate apparel shop into a leading retailer of emerging brands, particularly for women. Collaborations with notable design minded labels Whitley Kros and LnA coupled with a turn to style and fashion focused garments has given the brand an elevated look.

In an attempt to connect to the company's California roots, the brand launched a national digital and print initiative titled Golden State of Mind. Golden State of Mind, or GSOM for short, is about celebrating the creativity and diversity of California and its people. Working with photographers Nicholas Maggio, Harper Smith and Andrew Kuykendall, PacSun has looked to capture the beauty and imagination of California through lifestyle imagery from such places as Lake Arrowhead, Los Angeles, Malibu, Pismo Beach, Big Sur, and San Francisco. As part of the initiative, the retail giant created a lifestyle content website called GSOM.com. The site includes an interactive experience containing: campaign imagery and videos, landscape photography, a series of city videos that highlight the best places and locations in California, an interactive map, a user generated social media feed from Instagram, and a blog focused on: fashion, music, art, entertainment, action sports and brands.

References

External links 

Clothing retailers of the United States
Clothing brands of the United States
Swimwear manufacturers
Companies based in Anaheim, California
American companies established in 1980
Clothing companies established in 1980
Retail companies established in 1980
Companies that filed for Chapter 11 bankruptcy in 2016
Companies formerly listed on the Nasdaq
Surfwear brands